A plunger, force cup, plumber's friend or plumber's helper is a tool used to clear blockages in drains and pipes. It consists of a rubber suction cup attached to a stick (shaft) usually made of wood or plastic. A different bellows-like design also exists, usually constructed of plastic.

Use 
For the common plunger, the cup is pushed down against the drain opening, either pressing hard into the drain to force air in, or pushing down until the rubber cup is flattened, and is then pulled out, creating a vacuum to pull blockage material upward and dislodge waste or other material.

Shape and function 
The cup of a kitchen plunger looks like a rubber ball cut in half with a flared edge, while the toilet plunger's cup looks more like a distorted bowl, tapered on one half, with a large opening on the bottom.

A plunger is much more effective with water in the pipe, as water does not compress and thus transmits more of the applied force than does air.  When a plunger alone is ineffective, it can be supplemented by a chemical drain cleaner for sinks and tubs; or a plumber's snake for stubborn clogs, and clogs of the main line or toilet.

History 
The plunger was invented in 1874 by New York confectioner John Hawley, with the flattened rim added in 1876. The invention is referred to in the patent as a "vent-clearer", and was marketed as a "force cup".

See also
 Dalek
 Plunger mute for brass instruments

References

External links
 
 

Plumbing
Simple machines